The 1928 Philadelphia Athletics season involved the A's finishing second in the American League with a record of 98 wins and 55 losses. The team featured seven eventual Hall-of-Fame players: Ty Cobb, Mickey Cochrane, Eddie Collins, Jimmie Foxx, Lefty Grove, Al Simmons, and Tris Speaker.

Offseason 
 February 5, 1928: Tris Speaker was signed as a free agent by the Athletics.

Regular season 
By this time, the nucleus of the 1929–31 dynasty was in place for the A's. The team featured three starters who were later elected into the Hall of Fame: catcher Mickey Cochrane and outfielders Al Simmons and Ty Cobb. Cochrane was voted league MVP. Simmons led the team with a .351 batting average and 107 RBI. Cobb, in his last major league season, hit .323 in 95 games. Jimmie Foxx, Tris Speaker, and Eddie Collins also saw playing time for the 1928 team.

The pitching staff, led by 24-game winner Lefty Grove, allowed the fewest runs in the AL.

The A's were in a hard fought pennant race with the New York Yankees this season. After trailing the Yankees by 13.5 games on July 1, the A's caught fire with a 25-8 record in July and a 19-9 record in August. In September, the A's won the first 6 out of 8 games and on the 8th pulled into first place by 1/2 game by sweeping the Red Sox at Fenway Park in a doubleheader. However, on the very next day, the A's were swept by the Yankees in a doubleheader at Yankee Stadium to fall back into second place. The A's kept close on the Yankees heels, but couldn't overtake New York.

Season standings

Record vs. opponents

Roster

Player stats

Batting

Starters by position 
Note: Pos = Position; G = Games played; AB = At bats; H = Hits; Avg. = Batting average; HR = Home runs; RBI = Runs batted in

Other batters 
Note: G = Games played; AB = At bats; H = Hits; Avg. = Batting average; HR = Home runs; RBI = Runs batted in

Pitching

Starting pitchers 
Note: G = Games pitched; IP = Innings pitched; W = Wins; L = Losses; ERA = Earned run average; SO = Strikeouts

Other pitchers 
Note: G = Games pitched; IP = Innings pitched; W = Wins; L = Losses; ERA = Earned run average; SO = Strikeouts

Relief pitchers 
Note: G = Games pitched; W = Wins; L = Losses; SV = Saves; ERA = Earned run average; SO = Strikeouts

Awards and honors 
Mickey Cochrane, AL Most Valuable Player

League top five finishers 
Max Bishop
 #4 in AL in on-base percentage (.435)

Lefty Grove
 AL leader in wins (24)
 AL leader in strikeouts (183)
 #3 in AL in ERA (2.58)

Joe Hauser
 #4 in AL in home runs (16)

Al Simmons
 #4 in AL in batting average (.351)

References

External links
1928 Philadelphia Athletics team page at Baseball Reference
1928 Philadelphia Athletics team page at www.baseball-almanac.com

Oakland Athletics seasons
Philadelphia Athletics season
Oakland